Calgary Municipal Land Corporation (CMLC) was incorporated in 2007 as a wholly owned subsidiary of the City of Calgary to implement and execute the Rivers District Community Revitalization Plan – a public infrastructure program approved by the City of Calgary and the Province of Alberta to kick-start Calgary's urban renewal. Since its inception, the CMLC has overseen the development of the East Village, which as of January 2017 has seen CAD $2.7 billion worth of investment since 2010. The CMLC has also been tasked with the redevelopment of Calgary's West Village, Stampede Park, Victoria Park, Olympic Plaza, Arts Commons, and Fort Calgary.

See also
Calgary's East Village
George C. King Bridge
Jack and Jean Leslie RiverWalk

References

2007 establishments in Alberta